Mosaab Bander Al-Otaibi (born 3 March 1992) is a Saudi professional footballer who most recently played for Al-Adalh. He primarily plays as a winger or as an attacking midfielder.

Career statistics

Honours

Clubs
Al-Nassr
 Saudi Professional League 2014–15

References

Living people
Saudi Arabian footballers
1992 births
Sportspeople from Riyadh
Al Nassr FC players
Khaleej FC players
Al-Taawoun FC players
Al-Faisaly FC players
Al Batin FC players
Al-Adalah FC players
Saudi Professional League players
Saudi First Division League players
Association football midfielders